Ruslan Bakhytzhanovich Tleubayev (born 3 July 1987) is a Kazakh former cyclist, who competed professionally for the  team between 2013 and 2018.

Major results

2009
 10th Giro del Belvedere
2010
 5th Road race, Asian Road Championships
 6th Overall The Paths of King Nikola
 7th Overall Tour of Hainan
2011
 3rd Road race, National Road Championships
 8th Overall Grand Prix of Sochi
1st Stage 5
 8th Grand Prix of Moscow
2012
 1st Coppa della Pace
 1st Stage 2a Vuelta a la Independencia Nacional
 1st Stage 3 Girobio
 1st Stage 1 Tour Alsace
 4th Overall Tour de Normandie
1st  Points classification
1st  Mountains classification
 5th Race Horizon Park
 6th Overall Circuit des Ardennes
 6th Grand Prix de la ville de Nogent-sur-Oise
 6th Zellik–Galmaarden
2013
 3rd Tour of Almaty
2014
 1st  Road race, Asian Road Championships
 5th Road race, Asian Games
2016
 1st Stage 2 Tour of Hainan

References

External links

1987 births
Living people
Kazakhstani male cyclists
Cyclists at the 2014 Asian Games
Asian Games competitors for Kazakhstan
20th-century Kazakhstani people
21st-century Kazakhstani people